The North Newton Senior-Junior High School is located in McClellan Township, Newton County, Indiana. It serves students in the towns of Lake Village, Mount Ayr, Roselawn, Sumava Resorts, Thayer and Morocco, Indiana. Presently there are about 1400 students in this mainly rural school corporation.

School Board Members
Superintendent— Dr. Cathy Rowe
Director of Business Services—Ms. Karen Zackfia
Superintendent's Secretary—Mrs. Debbie Miller
Deputy Treasurer—Mrs. Mary Sheldon

Schools

Lake Village Elementary School

K-6 in the north
Approx. 210 students
Located in Lake Village, Indiana
14 students per teacher
Mascot- Tiger
Lake Village Elementary School (K-6) is located in the town of Lake Village. Money received through fundraisers is used to enrich student programs. Lake Village School has a curriculum that includes instruction for children with special needs, a gifted program, and counseling services.

Highest rated Elementary School in District

Lincoln Elementary School 
K-6 school in the north
Approx. 340 students
Located in Roselawn, Indiana
30 students per teacher
School Colors - Green and White
School Nickname - Lincoln Eagles

Morocco Elementary School
K-6 in the south
Approx. 210 students
Located in Morocco, Indiana
students vary per teacher
Activities/Clubs- Student Council, Gifted and Talented, student-led Corporation and store, Varsity Choir, tutoring club, Exchange City, Junior Achievement, 4H, Girl Scouts and Boy Scouts, student mentoring program, spelling bee competition, Robotics Club, DARE Program, SRC, computer lab
Sports- 5th and 6th grade boys and girls basketball is offered. Volleyball is also offered to girls in grades 5 and 6.

North Newton Junior-Senior High School
Grades 7-12
Approx. 776 students
Meets the state average of 17 students per teacher
North Newton has a graduating rate above the Indiana average at 83.8% of its seniors graduating in 2005.
Principal - Jason Hostetler 
Assistant Principal - Jonathan Rod. Coffing
Athletics/Activities Director - Jerry Taylor"
Director of Guidance - Linda Anderson
Each period lasts for 45 Minutes
School Colors - Blue, White, and Orange
School Song:
Note: "Newton's" song is a strict knock-off of the University of Michigan's famous fight song.
Hail To The Victors!
HAIL TO THE VICTORS VALIANT
HAIL TO THE CONQUERING HEROES
HAIL, HAIL TO NORTH NEWTON
THE LEADERS AND BEST.
HAIL TO THE VICTORS VALIANT
HAIL TO THE CONQUERING HEROES
HAIL, HAIL TO NORTH NEWTON
THE CHAMPIONS OF THE NORTH
School Nickname - Spartans
School Yearbook- The Olympian, as of 2006, there has been 39 volumes
Two gyms (1 High School, 1 Jr. High), swimming pool, football field, baseball field, cross country course
Offers honors and college prep courses
Offers Advanced Placement Exams in the following courses: English 11, Calculus, and Environmental Science
Clubs- National Honor Society, Student Council, FFA, FCCLA, Spanish Club, Math Club, French Club, Science Olympiad, BPA, Spell Bowl
Bands- Has a Jr. and Sr. concert band and a pep band
Choir- Offers Jr. and Sr. choir, and Spartans in the Spotlight which is a show choir

References

External links
North Newton School Corporation website

School districts in Indiana
Education in Newton County, Indiana